International Bank of Commerce (IBC) is a state chartered bank owned by International Bancshares Corporation headquartered in Laredo, Texas (United States). It is one of the largest banks based in Texas, and is the 83rd largest U.S. bank by asset size. In addition, IBC is the largest minority-owned bank in the United States. The motto of the bank is "We Do More".

History
IBC currently serves eighty-eight communities throughout Texas and Oklahoma with 215 branches and more than 375 ATMs.

Honoré Ligarde, a state representative for Webb County from 1963 to 1973, was a founder and later the IBC president.

References

Further reading 

America's Most Trustworthy Companies

External links

International Bank of Commerce Official Website

American companies established in 1966
Banks established in 1966
1966 establishments in Texas
Banks based in Texas
Companies based in Laredo, Texas
Companies listed on the Nasdaq